Juan Camilo Hernández Suárez (born 20 April 1999), known simply as Cucho Hernández, is a Colombian professional footballer who plays as a striker or winger for Major League Soccer club Columbus Crew and the Colombia national team.

Personal life
Born in Pereira, Hernández has been called Cucho since he was two years old because his father would shave his head leading him to be compared to a prominent Argentine soccer player at the time, Esteban Cuchu Cambiasso, who would also shave his hair off. Furthermore, people said he looked like an old man which is called cucho in Colombian slang.

Club career

Early career
Hernández joined Deportivo Pereira in 2015 at the age of only 15 years old, after impressing with an amateur side. He made his first team debut on 6 April 2015 at 15 years old, starting in a 2–1 home win against Deportes Quindío for the Categoría Primera B championship.

Hernández scored his first senior goal on 5 September 2015, netting his team's first in a 3–2 away win against Real Santander. After finishing his first season with three goals, he netted 20 times during his second, being the tournament's top goalscorer; highlights included a hat-trick in a 3–0 home success over Tigres F.C. on 3 July 2016.

Granada and loan to América de Cali
On 22 December 2016 Hernández joined América de Cali on loan from Granada CF, after signing for the latter side in September. He made his Categoría Primera A debut on 23 February 2017, coming on as a second-half substitute in a 2–0 home loss against Jaguares de Córdoba.

Hernández scored his first goal in the main category of Colombian football on 3 June 2017, netting the game's only in an away win over Deportivo Pasto.

Watford
After Granada was sold to Jiang Lizhang, former owner Gino Pozzo assigned his federative rights to Watford ahead of the 2017–18 season.

Loans to Huesca, Mallorca and Getafe
On 8 July 2017, Hernández moved to Segunda División side SD Huesca on loan for one year. He scored 16 goals during the 2017–18 campaign, as his side achieved promotion to La Liga for the first time ever. On 4 June 2018, his loan was extended for a further season, and he made his top tier debut on 19 August by starting in a 2–1 away win against SD Eibar.

Hernández scored his first goal in the main category of Spanish football on 2 September 2018, netting the opener in a 8–2 loss at FC Barcelona. He finished 2018–19 with four goals in 34 appearances, as his side was immediately relegated back.

On 26 August 2019, Hernández signed a new long term contract with Watford and joined RCD Mallorca on a season-long loan.

On 14 August 2020, Hernández remained in Spain and its first division, after joining Getafe CF on a season-long loan.

Return to Watford

On 14 August 2021, Hernández scored on his Watford debut in their league opener against Aston Villa, where Watford won 3–2.

Columbus Crew
On 21 June 2022, Hernández agreed to join Major League Soccer club Columbus Crew for a club-record fee of USD $10 million, joining as a Young Designated Player when the secondary transfer window would open on 7 July 2022. Hernández made his debut on 9 July 2022, coming off the bench in the 62nd minute to score the game winning goal against Chicago Fire FC. The following two matches, both coming off the bench as second half substitutions, Hernández added three additional goals, becoming the first player in MLS history to score four goals in under 90 minutes.

On 29 September 2022, it was announced that Hernández had been suspended one match for the use of offensive language in Columbus' match against the Portland Timbers on 18 September.

International career
After representing Colombia at under-20 level in the 2017 South American U-20 Championship, Hernández received his first call up to the senior side on 29 September 2018, for two friendlies against the United States and Costa Rica. He made his full international debut on 17 October, replacing Carlos Bacca and scoring a brace in a 3–1 win over the latter at the Red Bull Arena in Harrison, New Jersey.

Hernández also played for the under-20s in the 2019 FIFA U-20 World Cup, scoring a hat-trick against Tahiti.

Career statistics

Club

International 

Scores and results list Colombia's goal tally first, score column indicates score after each Hernández goal.

References

External links

1999 births
Living people
People from Pereira, Colombia
Colombian footballers
Association football wingers
Association football forwards
Colombia international footballers
Colombia under-20 international footballers
Categoría Primera A players
Categoría Primera B players
La Liga players
Segunda División players
Premier League players
Deportivo Pereira footballers
América de Cali footballers
Watford F.C. players
SD Huesca footballers
RCD Mallorca players
Getafe CF footballers
Columbus Crew players
Colombian expatriate footballers
Colombian expatriate sportspeople in England
Expatriate footballers in England
Colombian expatriate sportspeople in Spain
Expatriate footballers in Spain
Expatriate soccer players in the United States
Colombian expatriate sportspeople in the United States
Designated Players (MLS)
Major League Soccer players